Valsaín is a hamlet of Real Sitio de San Ildefonso, which is a town and municipality located within the Province of Segovia in Castile and León. The village had a population of 
176 inhabitants in 2016 (source: INE, the Spanish Statistical Office).

Monuments 
The ruins of the royal Palace of Valsain, a favorite summer palace of the Habsburg kings of Spain before they built the close by "La Granja" (Royal Palace of La Granja de San Ildefonso).

References

Province of Segovia